Maalaala Mo Kaya (abbreviated MMK), also known as Memories in English, is a Philippine anthology series, which was first aired on May 15, 1991. MMK is the longest-running drama anthology on Philippine television. From March to November, re-runs of previous episodes are being aired due to the Community Quarantines halting their productions. Also, for the entire month of May and the first week of June, no episodes were aired due to the network's shut down. As of December 5, new episodes were shown for the first time since nine months of production hiatus due to pandemic.

Episodes

References 

2020 Philippine television seasons
Maalaala Mo Kaya